The 2017–18 Nebraska Cornhuskers women's basketball team represents the University of Nebraska during the 2017–18 NCAA Division I women's basketball season. The Cornhuskers, led by 2nd year head coach Amy Williams, play their home games at Pinnacle Bank Arena and were a member of the Big Ten Conference. They finished the season 21–11, 11–5 in Big Ten play to finish in a 3 way for third place. They advanced to the semifinals of the Big Ten women's tournament where they lost to Maryland. They received an at-large bid NCAA Women's Basketball where they lost to Arizona State in the first round.

Roster

Schedule

|-
! colspan="9" style="background: #E11D38; color: #ffffff"| Exhibition

|-
! colspan="9" style="background: #E11D38; color: #ffffff"| Non-conference regular season

|-
! colspan="9" style="background: #E11D38; color: #ffffff"| Big Ten conference season

|-
! colspan="9" style="background: #E11D38; color: #fff"| Big Ten Women's Tournament

|-
! colspan="9" style="background: #E11D38; color: #fff"| NCAA Women's Tournament

Rankings

See also
2017–18 Nebraska Cornhuskers men's basketball team

References

Nebraska Cornhuskers women's basketball seasons
Nebraska
Nebraska